Juice fasting, also known as juice cleansing, is a fad diet in which a person consumes only fruit and vegetable juices while abstaining from solid food consumption. It is used for detoxification, an alternative medicine treatment, and is often part of detox diets. The diet can typically last from one to seven days and involve a number of fruits and vegetables and even spices that are not among the juices typically sold or consumed in the average Western diet. The diet is sometimes promoted with implausible and unsubstantiated claims about its health benefits.

History 

Juice fasting became a growing trend in the United States because of Norman W. Walker and Jay Kordich who worked to transform the juice drink into a diet. Walker is considered to be one of the founders of the juice cleanse trend because of his technological contributions to the juicing process and his promotions of a raw food diet. In 1936, Walker created the designs for the first mechanical juicer that he named the NorWalk. The modern Norwalk 280 version of his invention is still a high selling juicer, priced at US$2,495. In addition to this new technology, Walker also pioneered today's juicing cleanse through his many cookbooks that advocated for a raw, mostly liquid diet. Kordich rose to fame through his book, The Juiceman’s Power of Juicing which became a New York Times best seller.  During the 1990s, Kordich worked as a TV spokesman who promoted the health benefits of a juice diet. Kordich also appeared in infomercials promoting his Juiceman Juicer that, according to Kordich, made over US$300 million in sales. Walker's and Kordich's contributions to juice fasting propelled the diet to today's current version. 

In the twenty-first century, juice fasting has remained trendy with people continuing to believe that periodic juice cleanses can detoxify their bodies of unwanted chemicals. The ability for famous celebrities as well as other people to broadcast their juice diets on the internet has also popularized the lifestyle. According to the “Fruit Juice Market: Global Industry Trends, Share, Size, Growth, Opportunity and Forecast 2019-2024” report, 45.4 billion litres of fruit juice were consumed globally in 2018. By 2024, that number is predicted to reach 50.6 billion litres. The fruit and vegetable juice market's estimated value indicates this high demand for juice. In 2020, the global vegetable and juice market was valued at US$154.1 billion. This number is expected to increase around sixty percent to US$257.17 billion by 2025. The success of the juice market reflects people's continued use of juice as a way to cleanse their bodies.

Criticisms

Health claims in regard to juice fasting are not supported by scientific evidence.

Catherine Collins, chief dietician of St George's Hospital Medical School in London, England, states that: "The concept of 'detox' is a marketing myth rather than a physiological entity. The idea that an avalanche of vitamins, minerals, and laxatives taken over a 2 to 7 day period can have a long-lasting benefit for the body is also a marketing myth."

Detox diets, depending on the type and duration, are potentially dangerous and can cause various health problems including muscle loss and an unhealthy regaining of fat after the detox ends. A review in The Gale Encyclopedia of Diets, has noted potential risks of juice fasting:

  

Juice mixes containing grapefruit juice may adversely interact with some prescription drugs.

See also

 List of diets
List of ineffective cancer treatments
 Fat, Sick and Nearly Dead
 Green smoothie
 Fruitarianism
 Juicing
Juicer

References

Alternative cancer treatments
Alternative detoxification
Fasting
Veganism
Vegetarianism
Fad diets
Pseudoscience
Juice